Howearion is a genus of two species of helicarionid semislugs that are endemic to Australia’s Lord Howe Island in the Tasman Sea.

Species
 Howearion belli Iredale, 1944 – beautiful semislug
 Howearion hilli (Cox, 1873) – Lord Howe semislug

References

 
 

 
 
Gastropod genera
Taxa named by Tom Iredale
Gastropods described in 1944
Gastropods of Lord Howe Island